During May 2017, a series of clashes occurred in the Central African Republic town of Bangassou between Anti-balaka militias and MINUSCA forces.

History 
On 13 May 2017 around 600 to 700 Anti-balaka fighters entered Bangassou attacking MINUSCA base and Muslim Tokoyo neighborhood. They started pillaging the city and attacking Muslim residents. More than 3,000 people escaped their homes seeking refugee in a hospital, cathedral and mosque. Anti-balaka besieged mosque sheltering more than 1,000 people. On 15 May MINUSCA forces managed to recapture key points in the city freeing hostages from mosque. In the following days more than 115 bodies were found in the city. One MINUSCA peacekeeper from Morocco was also killed.

Responsibility 
On 7 February 2020, two and a half year after Bangassou clashes five Anti-Balaka commanders and 23 militiamen were sentenced for years in prison. They were found guilty of criminal conspiracy, illegal possession of firearms and murder.

References  

Central African Republic Civil War
May 2017 events in Africa
Mbomou
2017 in the Central African Republic
Conflicts in 2017
Massacres in the Central African Republic